Chlorisanis is a genus of longhorn beetles of the subfamily Lamiinae, containing the following species:

 Chlorisanis basirufofemoralis Breuning, 1957
 Chlorisanis viridis Pascoe, 1867

References

Saperdini